Richard Huggett (born 25 April 1929, London, England, died 15 April 2000 in Surrey, England) was an English actor, author, and playwright.

He best-known plays are The First Night of Pygmalion (1968) and A Talent To Abuse (1981), both originally written and performed by Huggett himself as one-man shows. The First Night of Pygmalion was later adapted for television in 1969 and again in 1975. A Talent to Abuse, in which Huggett played writer Evelyn Waugh, met with criticism from Waugh's son, Auberon. Huggett was also noted for his 1989 biography of British theatre producer Binkie Beaumont.

Works

Plays
 The Lupin-Blue Dress (1965)
 Good Egg (1967)
 The First Night of "Pygmalion" (1968)
 A Talent To Abuse (1981)
 A Weekend with Willie (BBC radio broadcast, 1981)

Nonfiction
 The Truth About Pygmalion (1969)
 The Wit of the Catholics (1971)
 The Wit and Humour of Sex (1975)
 Supernatural on Stage: Ghosts and Superstitions of the Theatre (1975)
 The Curse of Macbeth (1981)
 The Wit of Publishing (1987)
 Binkie Beaumont – Éminence Grise of the West End Theatre, 1933–1973. (1989) .

References

External links 
 
 Profile at Doollee.com (archived)

1929 births
2000 deaths
20th-century English dramatists and playwrights
English male dramatists and playwrights
20th-century English male writers